Maxacteon hancocki is a species of small sea snail, a marine opisthobranch gastropod mollusk in the family Acteonidae, the barrel bubble snails.

Description
The length of the shell attains 6 mm. It has a headshield with a pair of fleshy lobes; thin operculum. The white shell shows orange-brown markings at the base and at the apex. It contains a  large body whorl. The large columella is slightly twisted. The shell is sculptured with grooves

Distribution
This species is found in moderately deep water off the northern coast of North Island, New Zealand.

References

 Powell A W B, William Collins Publishers Ltd, Auckland 1979 
 The Seaslug forum : maxacteon hancocki

External links
 Spencer H.G., Willan R.C., Marshall B.A. & Murray T.J. (2011). Checklist of the Recent Mollusca Recorded from the New Zealand Exclusive Economic Zone

Acteonidae
Gastropods of New Zealand
Gastropods described in 1971